Bishop Gatimu Ngandu Girls High School, popularly known as BG or BeeGee, was founded in 1960 by Bishop Caesar Gatimu in Karatina, Nyeri County, Kenya. It was first named "Ngandu Girls' High School" for the area where it was situated. The name was later changed to honour its founder. It was originally run by the Comboni mission. Sister Nazarena Zonta and her deputy ran the school until 1983. Lay principals (or headmistresses) have headed the school since.

The school's Old Girls' group, (ONGA - Old Ngandu Girls Association) is uniting with alumni to help revamp the school and collect donations. The group visits the school to talk to the student body and offer them career advice and leadership. It has five streams from form 2 to 4 except form 1 which has seven steams and has 15 dormitories.

The school motto is "Unity is Strength".

The current school principal is Virginia Wahome.

Notable alumni 

 Cecilia "Amani" Wairimu, musician 
 Susan Kihika, lawyer and politician
 Grace Kiptui, politician
 Grace Mumbi Ngugi, judge in the High Court of Kenya

See also

 Education in Kenya
 List of schools in Kenya

References

1960 establishments in Kenya
Education in Central Province (Kenya)
Educational institutions established in 1960
Girls' schools in Kenya
Nyeri County
Catholic secondary schools in Kenya
High schools and secondary schools in Kenya